Siah Bid-e Olya (also Romanized as Sīāh Bīd-e ‘Olyā; also known as Sīāh Bīd-e Bālā) is a village in Dorudfaraman Rural District, in the Central District of Kermanshah County, Kermanshah Province, Iran. At the 2006 census, its population was 760, in 192 families.

References 

Populated places in Kermanshah County